Lily Lake is a lake in Washington County, in the U.S. state of Minnesota.

Lily Lake was named for its abundance of white waterlilies.

Naegleria fowleri 
Two swimmers have died from Naegleria fowleri infection. The first death was in 2010, followed by a second case of primary amoebic meningoencephalitis in 2012. These are the northernmost cases in the United States of this infection.

See also
List of lakes in Minnesota

References

Lakes of Minnesota
Lakes of Washington County, Minnesota